Arthur Ray Devlin (17 March 1926 – 17 May 1995) was an Australian politician. Born in Burnie, Tasmania, he was a waterside worker and Secretary of the Burnie Trades and Labour Council before entering politics. In 1984, he was elected to the Australian Senate as a Labor Senator for Tasmania. He held the seat until his retirement in 1990. Devlin died in 1995.

References

Australian Labor Party members of the Parliament of Australia
Members of the Australian Senate for Tasmania
Members of the Australian Senate
Australian waterside workers
1926 births
1995 deaths
20th-century Australian politicians
People from Burnie, Tasmania